The Remixes: Miho Nakayama Meets New York Groove is the third remix album by Japanese entertainer Miho Nakayama. Released through King Records on December 3, 1997, the album features six remixed songs; four of which are from her album Groovin' Blue.

The album peaked at No. 57 on Oricon's albums chart and sold over 5,000 copies.

Track listing

Charts

References

External links
 
 

1997 remix albums
Miho Nakayama compilation albums
Japanese-language compilation albums
King Records (Japan) compilation albums